The Toowoomba Bypass, known as Toowoomba Second Range Crossing during planning and construction, is a  grade separated, dual carriageway bypass and partial ring road constructed to the north and west of Toowoomba, Queensland. Construction commenced in April 2016. It opened to traffic on 8 September 2019.

History
The city of Toowoomba is situated on a plateau on the edge of the Great Dividing Range. A defining characteristic of the city is its high position on an escarpment of the range, which enjoys sweeping views of the Lockyer Valley below. The existing range road was completed in its current alignment in 1939. This road has unfavourable road geometry including tight corners and a rate of climb as high as 10.5%. The Warrego Highway is a major Brisbane-Darwin highway that passes through Toowoomba and utilises the existing range road. The Gore Highway is a major freight corridor that travels from Melbourne (via the Newell Highway and the Goulburn Valley Highway) and terminates in Toowoomba. In 2015, prior to construction of the bypass, up to 22,000 vehicles (including 2900 heavy vehicles) traversed the city's CBD each day, passing through up to 18 sets of traffic lights.

Planning
The need for a future second range crossing was first highlighted by Queensland Transport in 1991. In 1995, An Ove Arup Traffic Planning Study was completed confirming the need for a second range crossing. In 1997, an alignment route option passing to the immediate north of Toowoomba City was identified in a Maunsell concept phase planning report. The traffic planning study determined that the bypass route has to be close to the city as 85 percent of Warrego Highway traffic is stopping in Toowoomba. The proposed new alignment for the Warrego Highway commenced to the east, bypassing  the Toowoomba City centre to the north and linking up to the Warrego and Gore Highways on the western side of Toowoomba. The proposed alignment was 42.2 km long; up to 40 bridge structures; 5 major interchanges; and twin 735 metre long three lane tunnels through the range crest. Detailed planning of the project commenced in 2001 with the preferred alignment option ultimately refined by 2004. In late 2005, the federal government announced funding of $10 million to advance the business case for the project. Auslink committed $43 million towards further planning in 2008. A pilot tunnel 2.4m wide and 3.0m high was dug to provide detailed geological information. The pilot tunnel was in the centre of where the westbound tunnel was proposed.

Construction
In August 2015 the Department of Transport & Main Roads awarded the contract to design, construct, and maintain the Toowoomba Second Range Crossing to Nexus Infrastructure, a consortium of the Plenary Group, Cintra, Acciona, Ferrovial and Broadspectrum. Nexus was chosen on the basis that is proposed an open-cut design instead of tunnels, allowing the use of dangerous goods to utilise the bypass. There was also the concern that while the pilot tunnel had been dry at the time of excavation (during a drought), it later drained up to 10,000 litres of water per day.

The Federal and Queensland governments jointly funded the $1.6 billion project on an 80:20 basis.  It was delivered in a 25-year public–private partnership with the Nexus Infrastructure consortium. Upon completion, the road would be tolled.

Opening
The bypass opened to traffic on 8 September 2019. The Warrego Highway (A2) was rerouted via the bypass between Helidon Spa and Charlton (in the west), with the original section of Warrego Highway through Toowoomba renamed Toowoomba Connection Road (A21). The Gore Highway (A39) was rerouted via the bypass between Athol and Charlton, with the original section of Gore Highway to Toowoomba renamed Toowoomba Athol Road (A139).

Milestones

 31 January 2014 - Federal and state governments agreed to underwrite $1.6 billion to build a tunnel
 21 August 2015 - The Nexus Infrastructure consortium awarded to finance, build, operate and maintain the motorway.
 15 April 2016 - Start of major construction
 8 December 2018 - Western section of the crossing, between Mort Street (Cranley) and the Gore Highway (Athol), opened to traffic 
 Late 2018 - Scheduled completion. Originally scheduled for late 2018, but geological issues on embankment 24 set back expected completion by 4 to 7 months.
 7 September 2019 - Community Events including an open day featuring a walk on the viaduct, a 73km bike ride and a 42km marathon.
 8 September 2019 - Formal Opening Ceremony. Opening to traffic starting from 6pm. 3 month toll free period begins.

Benefits
The benefits of the new road to road users and the community, as claimed by the Queensland Government, include: 
 Avoids up to 18 sets of traffic lights in Toowoomba
 Reduces travel time (by up to 40 minutes) and greater travel time reliability
 Improved freight efficiency by redirecting up to 80% of heavy and super heavy commercial vehicles away from the Toowoomba central business district
 Reduction in vehicle operating costs by ensuring a maximum slope gradient of 6.5% across the Toowoomba Range, a significant decrease from the existing range crossing which is up to 10%
 Accommodate regional growth and increase productivity on the Darling Downs
 Safer and less congested route than the existing range crossing

Route description
The Bypass commences just west of Postman Ridge Road on the Warrego Highway. It deviates north-west passing up the range at a maximum gradient of 6%. After travelling for approximately 15 km the road passes over an 800-metre viaduct and then through a 30-metre cutting, passing under the New England Highway at the top of the range. From there it travels in a general South west direction reconnecting with the Warrego Highway at Charlton and ultimately connecting with Gore Highway at Athol. The bypass features 24 bridges, six interchanges and nine creek crossing. The posted speed limit is 100 kilometres per hour for its entirety except between the western entrance to the Warrego Highway and Mort Street where it is 90. The speed limit is enforced by point to point speed cameras.

Tolls

The Toowoomba Bypass is a Toll road only between Mort Street and Toowoomba Connection Road, with one toll point located just east of the Mort Street Interchange. It is a free-flow system requiring an electronic toll tag (e-TAG). It is mandatory for heavy vehicles to use the toll road unless they have a destination in Toowoomba or Warwick.

Even though the bypass is tolled, it is owned and operated by the Department of Transport and Main Roads (TMR). Transurban Queensland provides tolling service on the bypass on behalf of TMR.

Exits

References

External links
Nexus Infrastructure - Toowoomba Second Range Crossing Project Homepage
 TMR - Toowoomba Bypass

 
Transport in Toowoomba
Lockyer Valley Region
Toll roads in Australia